Jesuit College Preparatory School of Dallas (commonly referred to as Jesuit Dallas or Dallas Jesuit, and formerly known as Jesuit High School) is a private, college-preparatory school for young men under the direction of the Society of Jesus and home to the Jesuit Dallas Museum in Dallas, Texas. While Jesuit operates independently of the Catholic Diocese of Dallas, it exists and serves the Catholic community with the leave of the bishop.

History

Timeline
Jesuit High School opened on September 14, 1942. Located on the former grounds of Holy Trinity College on 3872 Oak Lawn Avenue in Dallas, Texas, the school had 195 students registered. September 1, 1955, it was the first school in Dallas to integrate, when sophomore Charles Edmond and freshman Arthur Allen, both African-Americans, enrolled.

On August 1, 1963, the school opened its current campus at 12345 Inwood Road.
In 1969 Jesuit High School became Jesuit College Preparatory School of Dallas under school president Rev. Paul Schott, S.J. The new name was meant to describe more accurately the school's character and curriculum.

In 1983 the Jesuit Dallas Museum was established with a rather unusual collection for a high school, including Salvador Dalí, Joan Miró, Braque, and Moore.

In 1986 the "Leaders for Dallas" wing of the school added 25% more square footage to the school. It included a lecture hall, computer labs, and departmental offices.

 In 2008 the school began the first of a series of major renovations stemming from its $26.5 million "We Are Jesuit" campaign. Many rooms, including the old student commons, were converted into classrooms. The auditorium was also demolished and filled with concrete, amphitheater style seating. Upstairs, new student commons and counselors' offices were built. The Arts, Assembly, and Athletic Building (AAA) was renamed as The Terry Center (or Mike and Mary Terry Family Foundation Center). In 2010, Postell Stadium completed renovation, named in honor of former school President Rev. Phillip Postell, S.J.. The stadium in now under renaming, after light was spread on Postell's past actions. The new facilities feature elevated viewing areas, increased spectator seating (over 5000), new concession stands and press box, and upgraded lighting and sound systems. In 2011 the three-story Athletic Tower was completed, creating space to house over 2,500 sqft. of athletic office space and lockers for over 20 sports teams, as well as the 9,000 sqft. Dell Performance Center.

Lawsuits 
In October 2019 a former student sued the school after alleging that the school's former president, Patrick Koch, sexually abused him. Two other lawsuits against the school alleging abuse by Koch where filed in August and September 2019 as well. Koch, who died in 2006, is among those named on the Diocese of Dallas' list of "credibly accused" clergy.

Campus
The  school campus is located on Inwood Road in North Dallas, Texas, adjacent to St. Rita Catholic School, south-west of the intersection of the Dallas North Tollway and Interstate 635 (LBJ Freeway).

Extracurricular activities

Athletics

Jesuit in Dallas and Strake Jesuit in Houston are the only private schools in Texas that compete in the University Interscholastic League (UIL), the athletic and extracurricular governing body for the state's public and charter schools. Jesuit currently competes in District 9-6A, the state's largest classification.

Jesuit teams have won 113 team state championships dating back to 1954. Most of the titles were won as members of the Texas Christian Interscholastic League (TCIL), a precursor to the Texas Association of Private and Parochial Schools (TAPPS) of which Jesuit was a member until 2000.

In 2010, the Jesuit Dallas soccer team, which finished the year 25-0-0 and was ranked No. 1 in the nation according to ESPN FAB 50 and the NSCAA, became the first private school team in the history of the state to capture a UIL championship. The historic 2010 team was declared "National Champions" by ESPN FAB 50 after winning 17 of its 25 games against teams ranked Top 50 in the nation according to the FAB 50 poll. Additionally, the team scored 67 goals, conceded 7, and boasted a roster consisting of 10 players that went on to play college soccer (with 8 of them playing NCAA Division 1). Dallas Jesuit won their second soccer state title in 2016–17.

The School also competes in sports outside of the UIL's jurisdiction. Ice hockey has won six state titles (1998, 2008, 2013, 2015, 2019, 2020), rugby has captured three Texas Rugby Union State Championship (2001, 2010, 2015), and cycling won the Texas High School Cycling League State Road Championships in 2015. Following its third state crown in 2013, Jesuit hockey became the first program in the state of Texas to be invited to the USA Hockey High School National Championships. Since 1996, Jesuit's Lacrosse team has advanced to the state Division I semi-finals 13 times, reached the state championship six times and won titles in 2016, 2017 and 2021.

The 2015–16 academic year proved to be a historic milestone for the Jesuit Dallas athletic program, with the Rangers capturing eight out of a possible 10 UIL 9-6A District Championships. The Ranger tennis doubles team of senior Campbell Frost and Hayden Kissee became the first duo to advance to the UIL 6A State Championship in program history, and the year was punctuated by a pair of state championships. Lacrosse won the first THSLL state championship in program history, 9–4, over Highland Park on May 15, followed by baseball which survived eight elimination games en route to a 6–2 win over Lady Bird Johnson High School in the UIL 6A State Championship game, winning the first UIL state title in team history. Additionally, crew captured second in the Boys Senior 8+ at the Stotesbury Cup Regatta in Philadelphia, Pennsylvania, also securing a berth in the Princess Elizabeth Challenge Cup at the Henley Royal Regatta in Henley-on-Thames, England before being eliminated by eventual runner-up St. Paul's School in heats.

In the 2018–2019 and 2019–2020 seasons, Jesuit's bowling team had a phenomenal run going 20–0 in district play, winning regionals in 2019 and placing second in 2020. With a qualification for state in 2019, the team composed of primarily Juniors placed 26th. In 2020, the team was considered one of the favorites to win the State Championship before it was canceled due to concerns centered around the outbreak of the COVID-19 virus.

Debate 
Debate is one of the oldest and most competitive activities at Jesuit Dallas, and in most decades since the 1940s the school's debaters have reached a top 20 ranking in the country. Dallas Jesuit has won four Texas Forensic Association State Debate Championships since 2000, with back-to-back titles in 2010 and 2011. In addition, Jesuit has finished inside the top 10 at the state championships nine times since 2001.

Robotics
Jesuit Dallas has offered a competitive robotics program since 2009. Earning the FIRST Rookie All-Star Award in 2009, the team qualified for the National Championships the following year, winning top honors at the VEX Robotics Regional Championships. In 2011 the program won the Dallas Regional Championship and secured a 16th-place finish at the FIRST National Championships. In the summer of 2013, Jesuit's team won the Texas Roundup Off-Season Event and claimed the unofficial Texas state championship. In 2014, Jesuit Dallas was part of the winning alliance at the FIRST World Championship.

Jesuit Dallas Museum
Jesuit Dallas has a gallery and museum with 500 pieces in the visual arts including ceramics, painting, prints, kinetic and stationary sculpture, and featuring artists such as Salvador Dalí and Dale Chihuly, as well as some pieces created especially for the school.

Administrators

Presidents
Source: Presidents at jesuitdallas.org
 Rev. Nicolas J. Roth, S.J. 1939–1945
 Rev. D. Ross Druhan, S.J. 1945–1951
 Rev. J. A. Sweeney, S.J. 1952–1953
 Rev. Thomas J. Shields, S.J. 1953–1959
 Rev. Robert A. Tynan, S.J. 1959–1965
 Rev. Paul W. Schott, S.J. 1965–1973
 Rev. Thomas J. Naughton, S.J. 1973–1979
 Rev. Patrick H. Koch, S.J. 1979–1980
 Rev. Larion J. Elliot, S.J. 1980–1981
 Rev. Clyde LeBlanc, S.J. 1982–1986
 Rev. Michael Alchediak, S.J. 1987–1992
 Rev. Philip S. Postell, S.J. 1992–2011
 Mr. Michael A. Earsing, 2011–

Principals
Source: Principals at jesuitdallas.org
 Rev. Joseph C. Mulhern, S.J. 1942–1945
 Rev. D. Ross Druhan, S.J. 1945–1951
 Rev. Edward P. Curry, S.J. 1951–1954
 Rev. Michael P. Kammer, S.J. 1954–1959
 Rev. Walter C. McCauley, S.J. 1959–1963
 Rev. Albert C. Louapre, S.J. 1963–1970
 Rev. Joseph. B. Leininger, S.J. 1970–1972
 Rev. Patrick H. Koch, S.J. 1972–1979
 Rev. Brian F. Zinnamon, S.J. 1979–1985
 Rev. Geoffrey R. Dillon, S.J. 1985–1993
 Rev. Paul Deutsch, S.J. 1993–1997
 Mr. Michael A. Earsing, 1997–2011
 Mr. Thomas E. Garrison, 2011–

Notable alumni

See also

 List of Jesuit sites

References

External links 

 

Boys' schools in Texas
Educational institutions established in 1942
Jesuit high schools in the United States
Private high schools in Dallas
Catholic secondary schools in Texas
Jesuit New Orleans Province
Schools accredited by the Southern Association of Colleges and Schools
1942 establishments in Texas